1806 Derice, provisional designation , is a stony Flora asteroid from the inner regions of the asteroid belt, approximately 10 kilometers in diameter. Discovered on 13 June 1971, at the Bickley site of the Perth Observatory in Western Australia, it was the first discovery of a minor planet ever made in Oceania. The asteroid was named after the wife of Dennis Harwood, staff member at Bickley.

Classification and orbit 

The S-type asteroid is a member of the Flora family, one of the largest groups of stony asteroids in the main-belt. It orbits the Sun at a distance of 2.0–2.5 AU once every 3 years and 4 months (1,222 days). Its orbit has an eccentricity of 0.11 and an inclination of 4° with respect to the ecliptic. The first used precovery was taken at Palomar Observatory in 1949, extending the asteroid's observation arc by 22 years prior to its official discovery at Bickley. The first unused observation dates back to 1927, at Tokyo Observatory.

Physical characteristics

Lightcurves 

A large number of rotational lightcurves for this asteroid were obtained from several photometric observations. The first observations were made by Italian astronomer Silvano Casulli in November 2006, and gave a rotation period  hours with a brightness amplitude of 0.19 in magnitude.

One month later, in December 2006, observations at the Carbuncle Hill Observatory gave a period of  hours with an identical amplitude of 0.19 in magnitude.

Between November 2009 and December 2012, Czech astronomer Petr Pravec at Ondřejov Observatory obtained three more lightcurves with periods between 3.2235 and 3.2237 hours and corresponding amplitudes of 0.07. 0.10 and 0.10, respectively.

Diameter and albedo 

According to the space-based surveys carried out by the Japanese Akari satellite and the NEOWISE mission of NASA's Wide-field Infrared Survey Explorer, the asteroid measures between 8.0 and 10.7 kilometers in diameter, respectively, and its surface has an albedo between 0.035 and 0.282. Astronomer Petr Pravec and the Collaborative Asteroid Lightcurve Link derive an albedo of 0.21 and a diameter of 10.7 kilometers with an absolute magnitude of 12.4.

Naming 

This minor planet was named after Derice Harwood, wife of Dennis Harwood, astrometric staff member of the discovering Perth Observatory. The official naming citation was published by the Minor Planet Center on 11 December 1981.

Notes

References

External links 
 Asteroid Lightcurve Database (LCDB), query form (info )
 Dictionary of Minor Planet Names, Google books
 Asteroids and comets rotation curves, CdR – Observatoire de Genève, Raoul Behrend
 Discovery Circumstances: Numbered Minor Planets (1)-(5000) – Minor Planet Center
 
 

001806
001806
Named minor planets
19710613